Black consciousness may refer to:
Black Consciousness Movement, an anti-apartheid movement in the 1960s in South Africa
Black Consciousness Day, or Black Awareness Day, a day celebrated every November 20 in Brazil